

Ernst Dehner (5 March 1889 – 13 September 1970) was a general in the Wehrmacht of Nazi Germany during World War II. He was a recipient of the Knight's Cross of the Iron Cross. In 1948 he was found guilty of war crimes at the Hostages Trial and was sentenced to 7 years imprisonment, but was released in 1951.

Awards and decorations

 Knight's Cross of the Iron Cross on 18 October 1941 as Generalmajor and commander of 106. Infanterie-Division

References

Citations

Bibliography

 

1889 births
1970 deaths
People from Hersbruck
People from the Kingdom of Bavaria
German Army personnel of World War I
Military personnel from Bavaria
Recipients of the clasp to the Iron Cross, 1st class
Recipients of the Knight's Cross of the Iron Cross
German people convicted of war crimes
German prisoners of war in World War II held by the United States
German people convicted of crimes against humanity
People convicted by the United States Nuremberg Military Tribunals
German Army generals of World War II
Generals of Infantry (Wehrmacht)